Natiruts Reggae Power Ao Vivo (Natiruts Reggae Power Live) is the first live CD and DVD by the Brazilian band Natiruts released in December 2006.

Recorded at Credicard Hall in São Paulo on September 1, 2006 the album is a collection of the band's career, featuring some of its most popular songs, such as Liberdade Pra Dentro da Cabeça and Presente de Um Beija-Flor and more recent songs like Não Chore Meu Amor, Quem Planta Preconceito and Quero Ser Feliz Também (which are from the record Nossa Missão from 2005).  The album includes a previously unreleased song Natiruts Reggae Power which was a hit in Brazil.

The album features Kiko Peres, who was the band's original guitarist in the tracks A Cor (The Color) and Meu Reggae é Roots (My Reggae is Roots) (released originally in Povo Brasileiro from 1999).

Track listing

Disc 1
 Natiruts Reggae Power (Sambaton)
 Não Chore Meu Amor
 Naticongo
 Surfista do Lago Paranoá
 Presente de Um Beija-Flor
 Verbalize
 Caraíva
 Iluminar (literally Lighting, Illuminating)
 Liberdade Pra Dentro da Cabeça
 Em Paz
 Leviatã
 Palmares 1999
 Quem Planta Preconceito
 A Cor

Disc 2
 Meu Reggae é Roots ('My Reggae is Roots')
 Eu e Ela (cover version 'Waiting in Vain' by Bob Marley)
 Toca-Fogo
 Forasteiro
 Leve Com Você
 Quero Ser Feliz Também
 Andei Só
 Deixa o Menino Jogar
 O Carcará e a Rosa

DVD version
 Natiruts Reggae Power (Sambaton)
 Não Chore Meu Amor
 Naticongo
 Surfista do Lago Paranoá
 Presente de Um Beija-Flor
 Verbalize
 Caraíva
 Iluminar
 Liberdade Pra Dentro da Cabeça
 Em Paz
 Leviatã
 Palmares 1999
 Quem Planta Preconceito
 A Cor
 Meu Reggae é Roots
 Eu e Ela (citação: Waiting in Vain, de Bob Marley)
 Toca-Fogo
 Forasteiro
 Leve Com Você
 Quero Ser Feliz Também
 Andei Só
 Deixa o Menino Jogar
 O Carcará e a Rosa

Personnel
 Alexandre Carlo Cruz: guitar, vocals and compositions
 Luís Maurício: vocals and bass guitar
 Juninho: drums

Other personnel
 Mônica Agena: solo guitar
 Bruno Wambier: keys
 Denny Conceição: percussions
 Ludmila Mazzucatti: vocals
 Luciana Oliveira: vocals
 Alexandre Herrera: sax-tenor and flute
 André Mitsuoka: trombone
 Paulo Roberto Pizzulin: trumpet and clarinet

Special personnel
 Kiko Peres: guitar in "A Cor" e "Meu Reggae é Roots"
 Guigui Trotta: harmonica in "Forasteiro"
 Funkbuia: vocalist in "Toca-Fogo"
 Daniel Ganja Man: dubs and effects

Producers
 Alexandre Carlo
 Daniel Felix
 Patrick de Jongh

2006 live albums
2006 video albums